The 1986 college football season may refer to:

 1986 NCAA Division I-A football season
 1986 NCAA Division I-AA football season
 1986 NCAA Division II football season
 1986 NCAA Division III football season
 1986 NAIA Division I football season
 1986 NAIA Division II football season